David Kinsombi (born 12 December 1995) is a German professional footballer who plays as a midfielder for  club SV Sandhausen.

Club career
David Kinsombi holds citizenship of Germany and the Democratic Republic of the Congo. He started his youth career with  Germania Wiesbaden and SV Wehen Wiesbaden. In 2011, he joined FSV Mainz 05. In the 2013–14 season he captained Mainz's U-19 team and appeared four times with Mainz's reserve team, competing in the Regionalliga Südwest.

In March 2014, Kinsombi signed a two-year contract with Eintracht Frankfurt. On 1 November 2014, he debuted in the Bundesliga in an Eintracht away match at Hannover 96. In July 2015, it was reported Frankfurt were wanting to transfer him to another club.

He moved to Karlsruher SC on 27 January 2016. He was instantly loaned out to 1. FC Magdeburg.

On 31 May 2017, Holstein Kiel announced the signing of Kinsombi for the forthcoming 2017–18 season. Hamburger SV announced on 9 April 2019, that they had signed Kinsombi for the upcoming season.

On 13 June 2022, Kinsombi signed with SV Sandhausen, reuniting with his brother Christian.

Personal life
Kinsombi's younger brother Christian Kinsombi is also a professional footballer.

References

External links

1995 births
Living people
Association football defenders
German footballers
Footballers from Hesse
German sportspeople of Democratic Republic of the Congo descent
Germany youth international footballers
SV Wehen Wiesbaden players
1. FSV Mainz 05 players
1. FSV Mainz 05 II players
Eintracht Frankfurt players
Karlsruher SC players
1. FC Magdeburg players
Holstein Kiel players
Hamburger SV players
SV Sandhausen players
Bundesliga players
2. Bundesliga players
3. Liga players